Zhang Hongdong  (born 20 March 1969) is a Chinese footballer who played as a forward for the China women's national football team. She was part of the team at the inaugural 1991 FIFA Women's World Cup. At the club level, she played for the team "Beijing" in China.

References

External links
 

1969 births
Living people
Chinese women's footballers
China women's international footballers
Place of birth missing (living people)
1991 FIFA Women's World Cup players
Women's association football forwards